Legislative elections were held in France on 1 August 1846. Only citizens paying taxes were eligible to vote.

Results

Aftermath
The legislature ended with the French Revolution of 1848.

References

Legislative elections in France
France
Legislative
France